The Chicago Film Critics Association Awards for Best Documentary  is an annual award given by the Chicago Film Critics Association since 2000.

Winners and Nominees

See also 
Academy Award for Best Documentary Feature

References

External links 
 Chicago Film Critics Association Awards

Chicago Film Critics Association Awards
American documentary film awards
Awards established in 2000